Words, Sounds, Colors and Shapes is an album by trumpeter Donald Byrd and 125th Street, N.Y.C. featuring Isaac Hayes released on the Elektra label in 1982.

Track listing
 "Sexy Dancer" (Donald Byrd, Isaac Hayes) – 5:11
 "Midnight" (Byrd, Hayes) – 5:07
 "So Much in Love" (Byrd, Hayes, Ronnie Garrett) – 4:00
 "High Energy" (William Duckett, Byrd, Hayes, Garrett) – 5:47
 "Star Trippin'" (Hayes) – 5:23
 "I'm Coming Home" (Hayes, Sam Hamlin) – 4:14
 "Forbidden Love" (Albert Crawford Jr., Hayes) – 5:24
 "Everyday" (Garret, Duckett, Crawford, Myra Walker, Eric Hines, Byrd, Hayes) – 5:04

Personnel
Donald Byrd – trumpet
Isaac Hayes – acoustic piano Fender Rhodes, vibes, percussion, synthesizer, concert bells
Ronnie Garrett – electric bass
William "Country" Duckett – electric guitar
Albert "Chip" Crawford Jr. – acoustic piano, Fender Rhodes, clavinet, prophet
Eric Hines – drums
Glenn Davis – percussion
Hot Buttered Soul Unlimited: Diane Evans, Diane Davis, Pat Lewis, Rose Williams – vocals
Myra Walker – vocals (track 6)
Issac Hays, Bill Purse – arrangers

References

Elektra Records albums
Donald Byrd albums
1982 albums
Albums produced by Isaac Hayes